Justice O'Neill may refer to:

C. William O'Neill, associate justice and chief justice of the Ohio Supreme Court
Harriet O'Neill, associate justice of the Supreme Court of Texas
William O'Neill (Ohio judge), associate justice of the Ohio Supreme Court

See also
Charles Austin O'Niell, associate justice of the Louisiana Supreme Court
John Belton O'Neall, judge on the precursor of the South Carolina Supreme Court
Lawrence O'Neil, associate chief justice of the Nova Scotia Supreme Court
Justice Neil (disambiguation)